George Washington is a 1984 American biographical television miniseries directed by Buzz Kulik. The series, in three parts, chronicles the life of George Washington, the first President of the United States from the age of 11 to the age of 51. George Washington is based on the biography by James Thomas Flexner.

The miniseries was shot mainly on location near Washington, DC and Philadelphia, and was aired on April 8, 10 and 11, 1984. Washington's life in the French and Indian War, the second part shows the coming and commencement of the Revolutionary War and the final part describes the victory of the independence from Great Britain. It was nominated for six Primetime Emmys.

In 1986, a sequel, George Washington II: The Forging of a Nation, aired with Bostwick and Duke reprising their roles as George and Martha Washington, respectively.

Plot
The miniseries covers the life of George Washington, from being a young man to his experiences in the French and Indian War and his rise to lead the Continental Army during the American Revolutionary War. It concludes shortly after the end of the war, with his return to his home in Mount Vernon.

Cast
 Barry Bostwick as George Washington – Commander-in-Chief of the Continental Army, and later first President of the United States, though his Presidency era is not included in the movie.
 Patty Duke Astin as Martha Washington – Wife of George Washington.
 David Dukes as George William Fairfax – Best friend of George Washington and husband of Sally Fairfax.
 Jaclyn Smith as Sally Fairfax – Wife of William George Fairfax.
 Lloyd Bridges as Caleb Quinn
 José Ferrer as Robert Dinwiddie – The lieutenant governor of colonial Virginia.
 Hal Holbrook as John Adams – Member of the Continental Congress and second President of the United States
 Trevor Howard as Lord Fairfax
 Jeremy Kemp as Horatio Gates – An American general.
 Richard Kiley as George Mason – An American patriot.
 Stephen Macht as Benedict Arnold – An American general, later defecting to the British Army.
 James Mason as Edward Braddock – A British general during start of the French and Indian War.
 Rosemary Murphy as Mary Ball Washington – George Washington's mother.
 Clive Revill as Lord Loudoun – A British nobleman and army officer.
 Robert Stack as John Stark – An American general.
 Anthony Zerbe as St. Pierre – A French Canadian military officer.
 J. Kenneth Campbell as Richard Henry Lee – An American statesman from Virginia.
 Philip Casnoff as Lafayette – A French aristocrat and military officer.
 Josh Clark as Tench Tilghman – An officer in the Continental Army during the American Revolutionary War.
 Kevin Conroy as John Laurens – An American soldier and statesman from South Carolina during the Revolutionary War.
 Peter Evans as Thomas Mifflin – An American merchant and politician.
 Megan Gallagher as Peggy Shippen – The second wife of General Benedict Arnold.
 John Glover as Charles Lee – A British soldier turned Virginia planter who was a general officer of the Continental Army in the American Revolutionary War.
 Harry Groener as Patrick Henry – The first post-colonial Governor of Virginia.
 Patrick Horgan as William Howe – A British General who was Commander-in-Chief of British forces during the American War of Independence.
 Robert Schenkkan as Alexander Hamilton
 Jon Matthews as John Parke Custis
 Christine Estabrook as Abigail Adams
 Tom Assalone as Augustine Washington
 William Prince as William Fairfax
 Richard Fancy as Sam Adams
 Scott Hylands as General Greene
 Kelsey Grammer as Lieutenant Stewart
 Farnham Scott as Henry Knox
 Tim Moyer as John Jay
 John Means as Brigadier General Charles O'Hara - The British Officer who surrendered in General Cornwallis' stead at Yorktown.

See also
 George Washington II: The Forging of a Nation (1986 sequel miniseries)
 We Fight to Be Free (2006 film)
 Washington (2020 miniseries)
 List of television series and miniseries about the American Revolution
 List of films about the American Revolution

References

External links
 

1980s American television miniseries
1984 films
American biographical series
Films about George Washington
Cultural depictions of George Washington
Cultural depictions of John Adams
Cultural depictions of Samuel Adams
Cultural depictions of Gilbert du Motier, Marquis de Lafayette
Cultural depictions of Alexander Hamilton
Cultural depictions of Benedict Arnold
Cultural depictions of Patrick Henry
Films scored by Laurence Rosenthal
Television films about the American Revolution
Television series about the American Revolution
Television shows based on biographies
1980s American films
Cultural depictions of Martha Washington